Piłsudski's Mound (also known as Independence Mound or Freedom Mound) is located in Kraków, Poland, and was established by the Polish nation in honor of Józef Piłsudski. An artificial mound, it was constructed between the years 1934 and 1937. It is located in the western part of Kraków, on the Sowiniec Heights, Kraków's VII District "Zwierzyniec". It is the newest and largest of Kraków's four mounds.

History
In 1934 the Polish Legionists, and their associations, proposed to build a monument commemorating the re-establishment of Poland's independence. The Committee for Mound Construction was created in Warsaw and was chaired by Walery Sławek. Construction began on 6 August 1934, the 20th anniversary of the departure of First Cadre Company from Kraków at the beginning of World War I.

After the death of Marshal Józef Piłsudski on 12 May 1935, the Legionists - former subordinates of Piłsudski, the creator of the Legions - decided to change the name of the mound after their leader. The mound was completed on 9 July 1937. Soil from every World War I battlefield in which Poles fought was placed into the mound.

During World War II, Hans Frank, Nazi German governor of occupied Poland, issued the order to flatten and destroy the mound, but due to the difficulty and expense it was never carried out. After the war, the communist government of Poland, which considered the mound a relic of the capitalist Second Polish Republic, still supported by the Polish government-in-exile, tried to minimize the mound's importance. Any mentions of it were removed from official publications and the surrounding area was filled with trees to help obscure the view. Unofficially it was referred to as the "Kopiec Sowiniec" (Sowiniec Mound). However, the most damage to the monument was inflicted during the Stalinist era; in 1953 the granite tablet with the Legion's cross was removed, and much of the surface area of the mound was devastated.

In 1981, with the weakening of the communist government, the reconstruction of the mound was begun. Soil from World War II battlefields in which various Polish armies participated was added to the monument, and it gained a nickname of 'Grave of Graves'. In 1995, five years after the fall of communism in Poland, the first major renovation of the mound was completed. In 1997 a major flood damaged the mound, and a second renovation began soon afterwards, finalized in 2002 with a ceremony attended by the president of Poland.

Design
architect: Franciszek Mączyński
landscape architects: Romuald Gutt and Alina Scholtz
height: 35 m (383 m AMSL)
diameter of base: 111 m
volume: 130,000 m³

Notes
a.  The other three major mounds in Kraków are Krakus Mound, Wanda Mound, and Kościuszko Mound.

References

 Kopiec Józefa Piłsudskiego on the pages of Pedagogical University of Cracow
 Remont kopca Piłsudskiego w latach 2001 - 2002 based on articles from Dziennik Polski
 Gallery at Gazeta Wyborcza

External links
Panoramic photo

Józef Piłsudski
Buildings and structures completed in 1937
Monuments and memorials in Kraków
Landmarks in Poland
Commemorative mounds
1937 establishments in Poland